Heart Still Beating is the second live album by Roxy Music and was released on 22 October 1990. It is credited as a recording of a concert in Fréjus, France on 27 August 1982, as part of their tour to promote the band's final studio album, Avalon. The album cover photograph features model Amanda Cazalet.

The Fréjus concert was filmed by Robin Nash for the BBC and released on home video in 1983 under the title The High Road, with songs in a different sequence. However, the four-song EP The High Road, also released in 1983, consists of audio recordings from a different night of the tour, in Glasgow, Scotland on 30 October 1982. The EP went out of print by 1990, being replaced by Heart Still Beating, which edits together both concerts.

Track listing

Personnel
Roxy Music
 Bryan Ferry - vocals, keyboards
 Andy Mackay - saxophone, oboe
 Phil Manzanera - guitar

Touring personnel
 Neil Hubbard - guitar
 Alan Spenner - bass
 Andy Newmark - drums
 Jimmy Maelen - percussion
 Guy Fletcher - keyboards
 Fonzi Thornton, Michelle Cobbs, Tawatha Agee - backing vocals

References

Albums produced by Bob Clearmountain
Albums produced by Rhett Davies
1990 live albums
Roxy Music live albums
Virgin Records live albums